Cainan Wiebe (born August 27, 1995) is a Canadian actor.

Career
Beginning his professional career as a child actor at the age of eight, Wiebe is a two-time Young Artist Award winner and five-time nominee, perhaps best known for his feature film roles in the Air Bud series, Black Christmas, The Sandlot: Heading Home, Diary of a Wimpy Kid, 16 Wishes and The Boy Who Cried Werewolf, as well as for his various guest-starring roles on such television series as Sanctuary, Tin Man, Supernatural, Falling Skies, R.L. Stine's The Haunting Hour, and American Horror Story.

Filmography

Accolades

References

External links

1995 births
Living people
Canadian male child actors
Canadian male film actors
Canadian male television actors
Male actors from British Columbia